The Canton of Picquigny  is a former canton situated in the department of the Somme and in the Picardy region of northern France. It was disbanded following the French canton reorganisation which came into effect in March 2015. It had 18,451 inhabitants (2012).

Geography 
The canton is organised around the commune of Picquigny in the arrondissement of Amiens. The altitude varies from 6m at Flixecourt to 134m at Vignacourt for an average of 50m.

The canton comprised 21 communes:

Ailly-sur-Somme
Belloy-sur-Somme
Bettencourt-Saint-Ouen
Bouchon
Bourdon
Breilly
Cavillon
La Chaussée-Tirancourt
Condé-Folie
Crouy-Saint-Pierre
L'Étoile
Ferrières
Flixecourt
Fourdrinoy
Hangest-sur-Somme
Le Mesge
Picquigny
Soues
Vignacourt
Ville-le-Marclet
Yzeux

Places of interest

Population

See also
 Arrondissements of the Somme department
 Cantons of the Somme department
 Communes of the Somme department

References

Picquigny
2015 disestablishments in France
States and territories disestablished in 2015